The Old Fort Braden School (also known as the Fort Braden Elementary School) is a historic school in Fort Braden, Florida. It is located on State Road 20, 18 miles west of Tallahassee. On April 14, 1994, it was added to the U.S. National Register of Historic Places.

References

External links

 Leon County listings at National Register of Historic Places
 Florida's Office of Cultural and Historical Programs
 Leon County listings
 Leon County markers

See also
 Education in Florida
 Fort White Public School Historic District

Historic buildings and structures in Leon County, Florida
National Register of Historic Places in Tallahassee, Florida
Schools in Tallahassee, Florida
History of Leon County, Florida
Public elementary schools in Florida